Hay Creek Township may refer to the following townships in the United States:

 Hay Creek Township, Goodhue County, Minnesota
 Hay Creek Township, Burleigh County, North Dakota